Oakville Public Library is the public library system for the Town of Oakville, Ontario, Canada.

Through its 7 branches, its website and its various Book Nook and outreach locations, the Oakville Public Library provides a wide range of services for Oakville residents.  In 2008 the Oakville Public Library (OPL) performed over 43.2 million service transactions. Over 79% of Oakville residents have a library card, one of the highest percentages of any library in Canada.

It has 137,000 works in its collection, making it Ontario's 25th largest public library.

Services
Information and reference services
Access to full text databases
Community information
Internet access
Reader's advisory services
Programs for children, youth and adults
 Delivery to homebound individuals
 Interlibrary loan
 Free downloadable audiobooks

Branch Locations
Central Branch, 120 Navy St.
Glen Abbey Branch, 1415 Third Line
Iroquois Ridge Branch, 1051 Glenashton Dr.
White Oaks Branch, 1070 McCraney St. East
Woodside Branch, 1274 Rebecca St.
Clearview Neighbourhood Branch, 1148 Winston Churchill Blvd.
Sixteen Mile Branch, 3070 Neyagawa Blvd.

Brief history

In 1827, Oakville's first library was established when William Tassie, the town's first schoolmaster, opened a reading room in the meeting hall located on the site of the current central library. The first use of the name “Oakville Public Library” occurred in 1895. Between the 1860s and the 1960s, the library moved to four other locations in town, only to return to the Navy Street site in 1967 with the opening of the new Centennial complex housing the library and art gallery.

See also
Ontario Public Libraries
Ask Ontario

References

External links
Oakville Public Library

Buildings and structures in Oakville, Ontario
Public libraries in Ontario
1827 establishments in Canada
Education in Oakville, Ontario
Libraries established in 1827